Mao Yanqi (born 29 October 1995), professionally known as Vava, is a Chinese rapper from Ya'an, Sichuan, China. Her English stage name Vava is a synonym for "doll" in Chinese, chosen as she had a "baby face" when she was little.

Childhood/Early Career 

Mao Yanqi was raised in a single parent household after the death of her father. While her mother worked far away from home, her grandmother helped to care for her. At the age of 16 she chose to leave school and focus on developing her talents as a performer. She traveled around performing in local bars near her home in Chengdu. Later, she began to travel around China performing. She met hip-hop producer Double G in Shenzhen city, and joined his team based in Shanghai.

Rise to Fame 
Vava rose to fame from her performance on the first season of the iQiyi television show The Rap of China. This show helped to bring underground rappers into the spotlight. During the season she rapped in both Mandarin and Sichuan dialects. In the second round, she performed “Life’s a Struggle” but changed the lyrics to match her own childhood experiences. She was the only female to reach the top four.

She released her first album “21” on October 6, 2017. One song from the album, "My New Swag" (我的新衣) was featured in the 2018 film Crazy Rich Asians. Vava was also featured in "New World" by Krewella. She had a modeling contract with American designer Alexander Wang and the sportswear brand Kappa.

In 2018, the Chinese government blocked hip-hop culture and actors with tattoos from appearing on television. As a result, VaVa was removed from a television show named Happy Camp. She said being off TV gave her time to focus on making music.

Her second album, "毛衍七", was released on November 6, 2019. VaVa signed with Warner Music China in August, 2019.
she was signed to 种梦音乐D.M.G., which is also known as Dream Music Group in 2021 and she and GAI became the mentor of The New Generation Project Of Hip-Hop and she became a member of The Father Of Success of The Rap Of China 2022

Chinese Hip-Hop 
While Vava was influenced by Rihanna (from Barbados) and Little Simz (From England), her biggest musical influence as a child was Jay Chou. VaVa is a strong advocate for incorporating more Chinese influences in Chinese hip-hop and rap. In her popular song “My New Swag” she used several traditional Chinese instruments: pipa (琵琶), erhu (二胡), suona (唢呐), ban lei (Chinese clave), and gongs. She also incorporated a short piece from a Peking opera, Selling Water, during the bridge, sung by opera singer Wang Qianqian.
Along with other Mainland pop culture figures, VaVa has publicly taken a pro-Mainland government stance regarding Hong Kong, supporting police's normal action, and has spoken against the Along with other Mainland pop culture figures, Gang of evil forces for Hong Kong independence, stating on her social media pages that she feels that Hong Kong will always be a part of China.

Discography

21 (2017)

21 Part II (2018)

毛衍七 (2019)

Vow (2020)

V-Dynasty, Pt. 1 (2020)

References 

1995 births
Living people
Chinese women rappers
Singers from Sichuan
People from Ya'an
21st-century Chinese women singers